Endless Flowers is the third studio album by American rock band Crocodiles. It was released in June 2012 under French Kiss Records.

Track listing

References

2012 albums
Crocodiles (band) albums
Frenchkiss Records albums